Hartford Airport can refer to several airports in Hartford, Connecticut:
Bradley International Airport
Hartford-Brainard Airport